The East Fork South Fork McKenzie River is a tributary of the South Fork McKenzie River in Lane County in the U.S. state of Oregon. It begins in and passes through part of the Willamette National Forest of the Cascade Range.

The East Fork, which has no named tributaries, runs along the north edge of the Three Sisters Wilderness. East Fork Trail 3308 follows the stream for much of its length, crossing it twice on footbridges.

See also
List of rivers of Oregon

References

External links
 McKenzie Watershed Council

Rivers of Lane County, Oregon
Rivers of Oregon